Ametropalpis vidua is a moth of the family Erebidae first described by William Jacob Holland in 1894. It is found in Cameroon, Gabon, Rwanda and Uganda.

The classification of this moth is disputed. Robert W. Poole (1989) treats it as a synonym of Ametropalpis though Martin Lödl (1996) excluded this species from Ametropalpis and Hypeninae  and transferred the genus to Catocalinae.

Biology
The adults have a wingspan of 49–53 mm.

References

External links
"Ametropalpis vidua, (Holland, 1894)" African Moths. Archived August 22, 2014. With image.

Hypeninae
Moths of Africa
Moths described in 1894